Talented and Gifted or Gifted and Talented may refer to:
Intellectual giftedness, an intellectual ability significantly higher than average
National Association for Gifted Children, a UK organization
Talented and Gifted program, any academic program for exceptional students
School for the Talented & Gifted, a Dallas high school
Gifted & Talented series, a popular book series for exceptional children and their parents

See also
G&T (disambiguation)
TNG (disambiguation)
Tag (disambiguation)